The Deposition is a 1615 painting by the Flemish artist Anthony van Dyck. It is now in the Alte Pinakothek in Munich. He later reworked it in his 1619 version of the subject.

References

Religious paintings by Anthony van Dyck
Collection of the Alte Pinakothek
1615 paintings
Paintings of the Descent from the Cross
Paintings of the Virgin Mary
Paintings depicting Mary Magdalene
Paintings of the Lamentation of Christ